Celina Toth (born March 20, 1992) is a Canadian diver in the platform (10 metre) events. Toth currently resides and trains in Victoria, British Columbia. Toth has been competing on the international stage since 2008.

Career
Toth' first major team was at the 2018 Commonwealth Games, where she competed in the individual event. In February 2019, Toth won her first ever gold medal at the FINA Diving Grand Prix stop in Germany.

In July 2021, Toth won the individual 10 m platform competition at the Canadian Olympic trials. This qualified her to compete in the individual 10 m event in Tokyo.

References

1992 births
Living people
Canadian female divers
Divers at the 2018 Commonwealth Games
Divers at the 2022 Commonwealth Games
Commonwealth Games competitors for Canada
People from St. Thomas, Ontario
Sportspeople from Ontario
Sportspeople from Victoria, British Columbia
Divers at the 2020 Summer Olympics
Olympic divers of Canada

Canadian people of Hungarian descent
21st-century Canadian women